Hamilton High School is a public high school in Anza, California, United States. It became a true 9-12 high school in the school year 2006–2007.

The school was used as an evacuation center during the Mountain Fire in July 2013.

References

External links
 
 Hemet Unified School District

High schools in Riverside County, California
Public high schools in California
2006 establishments in California